Fanny Street (21 November 1877, Wilton, Wiltshire - 20 March 1962, Hindhead, Surrey)  was Acting Principal of Royal Holloway College, University of London (RHC) in 1944-1945. Her brother was Arthur George Street author of Farmer's Glory.

Education
She was educated at Wilton Elementary School becoming a pupil teacher and then at Salisbury Diocesan Training College. She then attended Whitelands Training College, Chelsea, London. After returning to the Diocesan College she lectured in History for three years and then recognized she needed a degree. She was awarded a scholarship to Royal Holloway College where she gained a First Class Honours degree in History in 1907.

Career
She was a lecturer at Royal Holloway College from 1911 to 1917 and then worked briefly in the Ministry of Food Control. Together with Miss Phoebe Walters, Director of Music at the college from 1904-1915, she founded Hillcroft College for Working Women in Surbiton, Surrey, and was the first principal there from 1929 to 1933. The college was intended to be a female equivalent to Ruskin College in Oxford.

Between 1933 and 1947 she was the Royal Holloway College Association (the college alumni organisation) representative on the college's governing body. She became acting principal after the resignation of Miss Janet Bacon as she was not eligible for permanent appointment as she was already aged 66. She was succeeded by Dr Edith Clara Batho.

Street was a suffragist and joined the Labour Party when women were enfranchised. For many years she was a leading figure in the British Federation of University Women. She died unmarried.

References

1877 births
1962 deaths
People associated with Royal Holloway, University of London
Alumni of Royal Holloway, University of London
People from Wilton, Wiltshire